The 2000 FA Cup final was the 119th final of the FA Cup, and the 72nd (excluding replays) and last to be played at the old Wembley Stadium. It took place on 20 May 2000 and was contested between Chelsea and Aston Villa, the latter making its first FA Cup Final appearance since winning it in 1957.

Chelsea won 1–0 to secure their second FA Cup in four years, and their third in all. The goal was scored midway through the second half by Roberto Di Matteo, who had also scored in the 1997 final.

Wembley Stadium closed five months later, and was subsequently rebuilt. The FA Cup Final was played at the Millennium Stadium, Cardiff for the next six years, before returning to Wembley in 2007.

Road to Wembley

Match

Summary
Following a poor quality first half in which few chances were created, the match was brighter in the second, with Chelsea generally having the better of the play. George Weah missed several chances and Dennis Wise had a goal disallowed for offside, while Villa's Gareth Southgate headed wide. On 73 minutes, Roberto Di Matteo scored what proved to be the winning goal, capitalising on an error from Villa goalkeeper David James to put the ball in the net from close range. James came roaring off his line to deal with Zola's free-kick from the left, he fumbled the ball against Gareth Southgate's chest with Di Matteo blasting the rebound into the roof of the net. Villa could not get back in the match, their best chance falling to Benito Carbone, but his tame shot did not test Ed de Goey in goal.

Details

Statistics

Source: The People

References

External links
BBC Match Report
Game facts at soccerbase.com
BBC FA Cup Final 2000 Section

2000
Final
Chelsea F.C. matches
Aston Villa F.C. matches
2000 sports events in London
2000 Fa Cup Final
May 2000 sports events in the United Kingdom